Hammerheart is the fifth studio album by Swedish extreme metal band Bathory. It continued the previous album Blood Fire Death's transition away from black metal to what became recognized as Viking metal, and is considered a cornerstone work of the genre. A music video was made for "One Rode to Asa Bay."

Background and composition
Quorthon dedicated the song One Rode to Asa Bay, about the Christianization of Scandinavia, to C. Dean Andersson, who had earlier sent some of his books to Quorthon. The village's name in the song, Asa Bay, comes from pseudonym Asa Drake which Andersson used in some of his books.

Track listing 

The 2003 remastered edition combines tracks 5 and 6.

Reception 

AllMusic called the album an "unqualified triumph for the pioneering Swedish act."

Personnel

Bathory
Quorthon – lead and backing vocals, electric and acoustic guitars, keyboards, synthesizers, special effects
Kothaar - bass guitar
Vvornth - drums, percussion

Production
Black Mark Production - executive production
Quorthon - arrangement
Quorthon and Tomas "Boss" Forsberg - production, recording, mixing
Black Mark Production - publishing
Julia Schechner – album design
Sir Frank Dicksee – cover artwork, The Funeral of a Viking (provided by Manchester City Art Gallery)

Cultural impact
HammerHeart Brewing Co. is a brewery located in Lino Lakes, Minnesota whose name and branding was influenced by the album.  According to co-founder Nathaniel Chapman, “All of our beer names are inspired by Norwegian lore and we want to keep that attitude.”  The themes of the brewery and its beer are focused on Norse and Celtic mythology, and heavy metal music.

References

External links 
 

Bathory (band) albums
1990 albums
Viking metal albums
Noise Records albums